, simply titled Ape Escape in Europe and known in Asian countries as Ape Escape On The Move, is a 2010 rail shooter and party video game developed by Sony Computer Entertainment's Japan Studio and published by Sony Computer Entertainment for the PlayStation 3 video game console. The game was originally announced at the Tokyo Game Show 2009 as one of the title supporting the PlayStation Move controller. The title was released on December 9, 2010 in Japan, then in 2011 on June 22 for Europe, and on July 5 for North America. An English version of the game in Asia was also released January 31, 2011.

Gameplay

Unlike other games in the Ape Escape series, the game is an on-rails shooting game rather than a platformer. Players view the game from a first-person perspective with the motion controller acting as a gadget on-screen which include a floating net, a slingshot and a harisen. Players cycle through their arsenal using the Move button while either pressing the trigger button or performing gestures to utilize the gadget. For example, players swing the net to catch monkeys, press the trigger button to fire slingshots and wave the controller to use the fan.

Players traverse from area to area via an on-rails method. Each area is filled with monkeys and players must ultimately catch all of them using the net. Each gadget is used for a different purpose: slingshots are used to annoy monkeys, destroy objects, and shoot banana power-ups, while the fan is used to blow away debris. To shift the camera players press either the "X" or "O" buttons to turn left or right respectively.

Development
An Ape Escape game for the PlayStation 3 (named "Ape Escape" working title) was confirmed as a PlayStation Move title in Tokyo Game Show 2009 in September.

A trailer for PlayStation Move was released. It displayed a one second clip of the game, which involved the player catching monkeys with a net, using the move controller, in first-person view. Another image was released by Ape Club. It contained a picture of the "Gadget Widget", displaying the gadgets, and a new addition showing batteries. A full trailer for the game was finally released which was shown at the Tokyo Game Show 2010 on September 16.

An English version of the game was released in Asian countries like Singapore along with a PlayStation Move bundle in 2011, under the name Ape Escape On The Move. PlayStation Move Ape Escape was released for the US PlayStation Store during the Summer.

Reception

PlayStation Move Ape Escape received largely negative reviews, with average scores of 46.06% on GameRankings and 43/100 on Metacritic. IGN's Jack DeVries disliked the game and found that it was "missing a lot of shooter fundamentals like additional weapons ,[sic] co-op, and challenge", concluding that it was "an embarrassing, shovelware shooter that feels more like a bargain bin Wii title than a first party affair".

References

External links

Official Page @ PlayStation.com Japan 
Official Page for the English version of the game

2010 video games
Ape Escape games
PlayStation 3 games
PlayStation 3-only games
PlayStation Move-compatible games
PlayStation Move-only games
PlayStation Network games
Rail shooters
Video game sequels
Video games developed in Japan
Party video games
Single-player video games
Video games using Havok
Sony Interactive Entertainment games